The Oncidiinae is a subtribe within the Orchidaceae that consists of a number of genera that are closely related.

This subtribe consists of about 70 genera with over 1000 species, with Oncidium as its largest genus. These genera consist of a single floral type based on the angle of the attachment of the lip to the column, reflecting pollinator preferences. This has however led to several unreliable results and polyphyletic taxa within Oncidium. These were transferred to Gomesa and a new genus Nohawilliamsia, has been  described for Oncidium orthostates

Most species have well-developed pseudobulbs and conduplicate leaves.

It is possible to form hybrids in some instances between multiple genera within the Oncidiinae. These hybrids are often colloquially referred to as "intergenerics."

Genera
Genera recognized in Chase et al.'s 2015 classification of Orchidaceae:

 Aspasia
 Brassia
 Caluera
 Capanemia
 Caucaea
 Centroglossa
 Chytroglossa
 Cischweinfia
 Comparettia
 Cuitlauzina
 Cypholoron
 Cyrtochiloides
 Cyrtochilum
 Dunstervillea
 Eloyella
 Erycina
 Fernandezia
 Gomesa
 Grandiphyllum
 Hintonella
 Hofmeisterella
 Ionopsis
 Leochilus
 Lockhartia
 Macradenia
 Macroclinium
 Miltonia
 Miltoniopsis
 Notylia
 Notyliopsis
 Oliveriana
 Oncidium
 Ornithocephalus
 Otoglossum
 Phymatidium
 Platyrhiza
 Plectrophora
 Polyotidium
 Psychopsiella (sometimes included in Psychopsis)
 Psychopsis
 Pterostemma
 Quekettia
 Rauhiella
 Rhynchostele
 Rodriguezia
 Rossioglossum
 Sanderella
 Saundersia
 Schunkea
 Seegeriella
 Solenidium
 Suarezia
 Sutrina
 Systeloglossum
 Telipogon
 Thysanoglossa
 Tolumnia
 Trichocentrum
 Trichoceros
 Trichopilia
 Trizeuxis
 Vitekorchis
 Warmingia
 Zelenkoa
 Zygostates

In synonymy:
 Ada = Brassia
 Odontoglossum = Oncidium

References 

 Mark W. Chase - A Reappraisal of the Oncidioid Orchids ; Systematic Botany, Vol. 11, No. 3 (Jul. - Sep., 1986), pp. 477–491

External links 
 Details of the Oncidium Alliance
 Article on the Oncidium Alliance Orchids

 
Orchid subtribes
Taxa named by George Bentham